Gabriel Fernandes (born 22 April 1988) is an Indian professional footballer who plays as a winger for English club Shrivenham in the Hellenic League.

Career

Early career
Born in Porvorim, Goa, Fernandes began his career at Sporting Clube de Goa before joining Mumbai in the I-League. Fernandes made his debut for Mumbai on 6 October 2012 against Pailan Arrows at the Salt Lake Stadium. He came on as a 66th-minute substitute for Subhash Chakraborty as Mumbai lost 3–2. He then scored his first professional goal for Mumbai on 9 November 2014 against Sporting Goa on 9 November 2014 in which his 26th-minute strike was the first of three in a comeback from Mumbai as they won 3–2 after going down 2–0 earlier in the match.

Dempo
On 24 May 2013 it was announced that Fernandes had signed with Dempo of the I-League. Fernandes said that his reason for returning to the club where he spent part of his youth career was so he could remain close to family. He made his debut for Dempo on 22 September 2013 against Shillong Lajong at the Duler Stadium. He came on as an 82nd-minute substitute for Clifford Miranda as Dempo lost 3–0.

Pune (loan)
On 13 January 2014 it was confirmed that Fernandes had signed for Pune F.C. of the I-League on loan from Dempo for the rest of the season. He then made his debut for Pune the next day in the club's opening Federation Cup fixture against Eagles. He came on as a half-time substitute for Arata Izumi as Pune drew 1–1. Fernandes then scored his first goals for the club two games later against Churchill Brothers on 20 January 2014. He scored two in this match but they were not enough as Pune lost 3–2 and were thus knocked-out of the Federation Cup.

Fernandes then scored his first league goal for Pune on 19 February 2014 against Mohammedan as Pune won 2–0.

East Bengal
In June 2017, Fernandes signed for East Bengal. He made  his debut for East Bengal in the I-League in a 7–1 home win against Chennai City on 24 February 2018. He came in as an 80th-minute substitute for Brandon Vanlalremdika and scored his first goal for the club in the 84th minute.

Shrivenham FC
In 2019, Farnandes moved to England and signed with Hellenic Football League outfit Shrivenham.

Career statistics

Honours
Sporting Clube dé Goa
I-League 2nd Division runner-up: 2010–11
Dempo
Indian Federation Cup: 2014–15

See also
 List of Indian football players in foreign leagues

References

External links 
 I-League Profile.
Gabriel Fernandes at MyKhel

1988 births
Living people
People from North Goa district
Indian footballers
Indian expatriate footballers
Mumbai FC players
Dempo SC players
Pune FC players
Association football midfielders
Footballers from Goa
I-League players
FC Goa players
Mumbai City FC players
Churchill Brothers FC Goa players
East Bengal Club players
Indian Super League players
Indian expatriate sportspeople in England
Indian expatriate sportspeople in the United Kingdom